Under the Sound Umbrella is the second album from The Dude of Life, a childhood friend of Phish leader Trey Anastasio and a lyrical contributor to many of Phish's early songs. This was the first album released by the Dude of Life in almost five years.

The album features guest appearances from Phish members Anastasio, Mike Gordon, and Jon Fishman. "Tow Truck Driver" is a collaboration between the Dude of Life and Anastasio.

The Dude's backing band on the album is The Great Red Shark.

The album has been out of print since 2000.

In writing about the album, William Ruhlmann at Allmusic said that it has "quirky lyrics that border on novelties" with a style reminiscent of the Beatles and David Bowie.

Track listing
"Beware Of The Dog"    
"Francella"   
"Tow Truck Driver"   
"Come On Up To My Room"    
"Puppydog Named Madness"    
"Paparazzi"    
"Scuba Dive"  
"Pete Rose"   
"Sound Umbrella"   
"What You Do To Me"

Personnel
The Dude of Life: vocals 
Trey Anastasio: guitar
Dan Archer: guitar
Cliff Mays: guitar
Mike Gordon: bass
Aaron Hersey: bass
Paul Gassman: bass
Phil Abair: keyboards
Mark Thors: keyboards
Brian Bull: piano, cowbell
Jon Fishman: drums
Jim Weingast: drums
Erica Lynn Gruenberg: background vocals
Maura Murphy: background vocals

References

1999 albums
Phish
The Dude of Life albums